Sarot Sukkhayang (also spelled Saroj and Sukhayang/Sukkayang, born Saroj Subhung, 1898–1950), also known by the noble title Phra Sarot Rattananimman, was a Thai architect who designed many public buildings in the first half of the twentieth century. He was among the first Thais to receive formal architecture education in Europe, graduating from the University of Liverpool in 1920, and served as Director of the Architecture Division of the Fine Arts Department. Among his contributions are several buildings at Siriraj Hospital and Chulalongkorn University, including the university's main auditorium.

References

Sarot Sukkhayang
Sarot Sukkhayang
Sarot Sukkhayang
Alumni of the University of Liverpool
1898 births
1950 deaths